The third season of the Indian Tamil-language reality singing television series Sa Re Ga Ma Pa Seniors premiered on Zee Tamil on 18 December 2022. The four main judges of this show are Srinivas, Karthik, Vijay Prakash and Remya Nambeesan. Remya Nambeesan is the fourth new judge who has joined Sa Re Ga Ma Pa from season 3.Archana Chandhoke has returned as the host for the third time. This show has been a fame to have many talented contestants from many diverse backgrounds including those with disability (including visual impairment, albinism in humans).

Format
The show started with 23 contestants after the mega-blind audition round. There will be several rounds of performances to shortlist the top contestants for the finale. On each round of the show, four judges and jury members from various musical backgrounds weigh in with their points to judge every performance. The four judges rate the performances on a scale of 10 and the jury members on a scale of 5. The performance is recognized as golden if all the judges decide to rate a contestant's effort with 10 points. For a golden performance, the judges sing "Kannamaniye <name> Kalakipotta Nee / Sokkavaikkum Paatai Paadi Asathipotta Nee / Aatam Poordu (double clap) / Vetta Poordu (double clap) / Aatam Poordu Vetta Poordu Santhoshame Sa Re Ga Ma Pa / Ithu Golden Performance" and the contestant would receive a golden shower on the stage. For the first time, contestants Akshaya and Sharath were given a diamond performance during the "Kaadhale Kaadhali" (love songs) round for their rendition of "Vaaji vaaji" song from the movie Sivaji.

If a contestant does not achieve 10/10,  the total points are computed by accumulating the scores from the jury members and the judges. Each juror's score must be a whole number, and the judges' score can be in increments of 0.5. Srinivas' score would be a "secret" score, meaning that this score would not be revealed (unless the performance was a golden performance). It would still be counted when adding up the total score. At the end of every week, awards would be given to several performances, such as the week's best performance. Moreover, participants who received the lowest scores will move into the danger zone and, depending on their marks, will either be saved or eliminated. The first set of elimination led to three participants leaving the competition.

Auditions 
The channel started taking auditions for this season through online audition registration. Then the offline auditions started on 18 September 2022 and placed in Tamil Nadu, Telangana, Andhra Pradesh, Kerala and Karnataka as well as from international waters ( such as United Kingdom and Sri Lanka), the jury and judges picked out the top 45 talented singers and they will battle it out to grab a position in the final 20. During the season auditions and the competitive rounds, special guests, from film directors, music directors, singers and actors/actresses ,  such as D. Imman, Yuvan Shankar Raja, Sean Roldan, L. R. Eswari, Vaikom Vijayalakshmi, T. L. Maharajan, Krish (singer),  Mahathi,  Mysskin , Kavin (actor), Manju Warrier have showed their appearances and praised with wonderful comments alongside the judges and jury members for the outstanding performances given by the contestants. Alongside the guests' appearances, several music directors, such as Yuvan Shankar Raja , D. Imman and Sean Roldan have promised during the competitive rounds, that they would offer several contestants to sing in their albums , that includes films. The music director, D. Imman,  gave this offer to several exceptional contestants , such as Shamala Devi and Purushothaman after viewing their marvellous performances. In addition, another music director Sean Roldan, gave an offer to Jeevan and Purushothaman.

Episodes

Contestants

Rounds 

 The contestant who received the golden performance tag
 The contestant who saved from danger zone
 The contestant who got eliminated
 The contestant who received the diamond performance tag
 The contestant who was absent from the round

References

External links
 Sa Re Ga Ma Pa Seniors 3 at ZEE5

Zee Tamil original programming
Tamil-language singing talent shows
Tamil-language reality television series
Tamil-language television shows
Television shows set in Tamil Nadu
2022 Tamil-language television seasons